Norbert Eimer (19 March 1940 – 3 February 2021) was a German politician of the Free Democratic Party (FDP) who served as member of the German Bundestag.

Life 
Eimer entered the German Bundestag in the 1976 federal elections via the FDP state list in Bavaria in West Germany and Germany and was a member of the Bundestag throughout until 1994. Until 1987 he was a member of the committee for youth, family and health. From 1987 to 1990 he was on the Committee for Youth, Family, Women and Health.

Literature

References 

1940 births
2021 deaths
Members of the Bundestag for Bavaria
Members of the Bundestag 1990–1994
Members of the Bundestag 1987–1990
Members of the Bundestag 1983–1987
Members of the Bundestag 1980–1983
Members of the Bundestag 1976–1980
Members of the Bundestag for the Free Democratic Party (Germany)
Sudeten German people
People from Trutnov